The 1932–33 Bezirksliga Bayern was the tenth and last season of the league, one of the eight Bezirksligas in Southern Germany at the time. It was the first tier of the football league system in Bavaria (German:Bayern) from 1923 to 1933. The league was organised in two regional divisions, north and south, with the best two teams from each qualified for the Southern German championship.

The southern division was won by FC Bayern Munich, the 1932 German champions. For Bayern it was the sixth consecutive title in the southern division and seventh Bezirksliga title over all. In the northern division 1. FC Nürnberg won its sixth Bezirksliga title. The two league champions and the runners-up SpVgg Fürth and SV 1860 München qualified for the 1933 Southern German championship where they played in a group with the best four teams of the Bezirksliga Rhein-Saar. The four Bavarian clubs took up top spot in this group and the group winner, SV 1860 München, qualified for the championship final where it lost 1–0 to FSV Frankfurt. 

Frankfurt and SV 1860 then qualified for the 1933 German football championship where the latter reached the semi-finals where it lost 4–0 to FC Schalke 04.

The 1932–33 marked the end of the Bezirksliga as the top tier in Southern Germany and Bavaria as well as the end of the Southern German championship. The league was replaced by the Gauliga Bayern, one of 16 Gauligas in Germany from 1933 onward, introduced after the rise of the Nazis to power in 1933. Twelve clubs from the two Bezirksligas qualified for the new Gauliga Bayern while the two clubs from Ulm, located in Württemberg, were moved to the new Gauliga Württemberg.

League tables 
The 1932–33 season saw two new clubs in the league, Germania Nürnberg and SpVgg Erlangen.

Table 
The 1932–33 season saw two new clubs in the league, FV Ulm and SpVgg Landshut.

References

Sources

External links
 Das Deutsche Fussball Archiv  Historic German league tables

1